The Paul Henry–Thornapple Rail Trail (commonly referred to as the Thornapple Trail or Paul Henry Trail) is a rail trail that when complete will be  long, running from Grand Rapids to Vermontville, Michigan. The trail closely follows the original route of the Grand River Valley Railroad, constructed in 1868-69 and in operation from 1870 to 1983. The trail is managed by multiple different agencies. The trail has multiple paved sections still to be connected, with a 2 mile gap between Caledonia and Middleville, a 5-mile gap between Middleville and Hastings, and multiple smaller gaps between Hastings and Nashville. The longest completed section of trail is within Kent county between the trail terminus at Kalamazoo Avenue in Kentwood to 108th Street in Caledonia Township. The trail has connections with the Frederik Meijer Trail (previously the M-6 Trail) and the East-West Trail both in Kentwood. A section of the trail from Irving to Middleville (McCann Rd. to Crane Rd.) is part of the North Country National Scenic Trail.

History
The trail is built on a section of the former route of the Grand River Valley Railroad which ran from Grand Rapids to Jackson. The railroad was originally chartered on May 4, 1846, but laid dormant for 20 years. Construction on the line started in 1868–1869. The first train, pulled by the locomotive "Muskegon", arrived in Grand Rapids on January 1, 1870. Regular service began a few weeks later on January 17.

Shortly after the line's creation on August 15, 1870, it was perpetually leased by the Michigan Central Railroad as a branch for their system. On September 15, 1916, the Grand River Valley Railroad was formerly merged into the Michigan Central Railroad. On February 1, 1930, The New York Central Railroad absorbed the Michigan Central.

In the 1920s passenger service was a daily train each way between Grand Rapids and Detroit, by the 1950s the service had been downgraded from a train to a motorized passenger car called a Budd Rail Diesel Car or RDC, New York Central referred to the service as "The Beeliner". The tracks were well maintained and had relatively high speed limits of 60 mph for passenger service and 40 mph for freight. Passenger service ended with the last Beeliner running in December 1959. Freight service continued and usually consisted of a daily train heading from Grand Rapids to Jackson with a return trip the next day.

On February 1, 1968, New York Central merged with Pennsylvania Railroad to form Penn Central Railroad. By 1970 Penn Central was in bankruptcy and track maintenance and service suffered. On April 1, 1976 Conrail took over operation of the line and discontinued service on the line east of Vermontville to Eaton Rapids. Conrail did not want to continue operating the remaining line but agreed to under a contract with the State of Michigan. In 1979 Conrail did not renew its agreement with the state.

On July 15, 1979, the Kent, Barry and Eaton Connecting Railway began service under contract with a subsidy for operating the line between Grand Rapids and Vermontville. It was the first minority owned railroad in the country. Freight primarily consisted of grain, fertilizer, scrap metal, and farm equipment. A failure to build freight traffic on the line combined with "inexperienced railroad management" led to the state ending the line's operating subsidy and service on the line ceasing completely on October 15, 1983.

Route Description

Kent 
The northwest terminus is at Kalamazoo Avenue just south of 44th Street on the border between Kentwood and Grand Rapids. The trail begins heading southeast and after a mile has a connection with the East-West Trail in Kentwood. The trail continues heading southeast toward 60th Street and Wing Avenue where it connects to the Frederik Meijer Trail (previously the M-6 Trail). The trail then heads east along 60th Street connecting to Paris Park Nature Reserve and running through East Paris Nature Park. After heading through the park the trail turns south to follow East Paris Avenue before going over the M-6 freeway. After crossing 68th Street the trail leaves East Paris Avenue and continues heading south through farmland before rejoining the old railroad embankment. At the embankment is a spur following the old rail line northwest, connecting to Dutton Shadyside Park and 68th Street. The trail continues south until 76th Street before turning east, rejoining the embankment and continuing southeast. The trail continues for 4 miles before arriving at Main Street in the Village of Caledonia where the trail switches to sidewalks and sharrows through the village until South Maple Street and Kinsey Street where the trail begins again heading southeast. The trail turns to the east to cross M-37 before quickly turning back south to rejoin the embankment and continuing southeast to the Kent/Barry county line at 108th Street.

Barry/Eaton 

After crossing 108th Street, the trail surface switches from paved asphalt to graded dirt before the trail ends at Stimson Road. The trail section between Stimson Road and Crane Road is currently private property and is in the planning/proposal stage. Trail users here follow an on-road segment on Stimson Road south to M-37 and then east on Crane Road before rejoining with the paved trail in Middleville. A section of the trail south of Middleville is closed in November for hunting season. This section of the trail closely follows the Thornapple River and continues for 5 miles, crossing the Thornapple River on an old converted rail bridge, down to Irving at McCann Road where the trail changes from asphalt to grass and then continues for another 2 miles before ending at private property on Irving Road. The section between Irving Road and Hastings is currently in the planning/proposal stage. The trail within Hastings city limits has been completed and connects to both Tyden Park and Bliss Riverfront Park. To the east of Hastings there are multiple sections of trail divided by private property, with 10 miles of mostly grass and some paved trail divided by 4 miles of private property, these sections are currently in the planning/proposal stage. Currently there is a grass trail starting at Greggs Crossing Road running southeast along the Thornapple River before turning northeast through Nashville. After leaving Nashville the trail continues along the river entering Eaton county until it reaches Maple Valley High School where the trail changes to asphalt before crossing the Thornapple River again on another converted rail bridge before arriving at the trail terminus in Vermontville.

Trailheads

References

Protected areas of Barry County, Michigan
Protected areas of Eaton County, Michigan
Protected areas of Kent County, Michigan
Rail trails in Michigan
Michigan Central Railroad
Bike paths in Michigan
Hiking trails in Michigan
Transportation in Kent County, Michigan
West Michigan